The Rigidalstock is a mountain of the Urner Alps, located on the border between the cantons of Nidwalden and Obwalden in Central Switzerland. It lies south of the Gross Walenstock.

The closest locality is Engelberg on its southern side.

References

External links
 Rigidalstock on Hikr

Mountains of the Alps
Mountains of Switzerland
Mountains of Obwalden
Mountains of Nidwalden
Nidwalden–Obwalden border